Placid Casual is the Cardiff based record label set up in 1998 by Super Furry Animals. It is named after a track on their album Radiator.

According to the label's website "Placid Casual retains an amateur status and an a&r policy of blatant nepotism. We exist to expose to the world (when we can be bothered), songs that come our way that may be ignored otherwise." The Independent has described the label as an "enterprise run by passion not for profit".

Super Furry Animals released their Welsh language album Mwng on the label before leaving to sign with Epic Records.

Gruff Rhys also released his debut solo album, Yr Atal Genhedlaeth, on the label in 2005.

See also
 List of record labels

References

External links
 Placid Casual website

Super Furry Animals
Welsh record labels
Record labels established in 1998
Alternative rock record labels
Companies based in Cardiff
Economy of Cardiff